The 2015–16 Oklahoma Sooners women's basketball team will represent the University of Oklahoma in the 2015–16 NCAA Division I women's basketball season. The Sooners are led by Sherri Coale in her twentieth season. The team will play its home games at the Lloyd Noble Center in Norman, Oklahoma as a member of the Big 12 Conference. They finished the season 22–11, 11–7 in Big 12 play to finish in a tie for fourth place. They advanced to the semifinals of the Big 12 women's tournament where they lost to Baylor. They received at-large bid of the NCAA women's tournament where they defeated Purdue in the first round before losing to Kentucky in the second round.

Roster

Schedule

|-
! colspan=9 style="background:#960018; color:#FFFDD0;"| Exhibition

|-
! colspan=9 style="background:#960018; color:#FFFDD0;"| Non-conference regular season

|-
! colspan=9 style="background:#960018; color:#FFFDD0;"| Big 12 Regular Season

|-
! colspan=9 style="background:#960018; color:#FFFDD0;"| Big 12 Women's Tournament

|-
! colspan=9 style="background:#960018; color:#FFFDD0;"| NCAA Women's Tournament

x- Sooner Sports Television (SSTV) is aired locally on Fox Sports. However the contract allows games to air on various affiliates. Those affiliates are FSSW, FSSW+, FSOK, FSOK+, and FCS Atlantic, Central, and Pacific.

Rankings
2015–16 NCAA Division I women's basketball rankings

See also
2015–16 Oklahoma Sooners men's basketball team

References

External links
Official Athletics Site of the Oklahoma Sooners - Women's Basketball

Oklahoma Sooners women's basketball seasons
Oklahoma
Oklahoma
Oklahoma Sooners women's basketball team
Oklahoma Sooners women's basketball team